Bauchi (earlier Yakoba) is a city in northeast Nigeria, the Administrative center of Bauchi State, of the Bauchi Local Government Area within that State, and of the traditional Bauchi Emirate. It is located on the northern edge of the Jos Plateau, at an elevation of 616 m. The Local Government Area covers an area of 3,687 km2 and had a population of 493,810 in 2006.

Bauchi City is among the twenty Local Government Areas of Bauchi state:

Bauchi, Tafawa Balewa, Dass, Toro, Bogoro, Ningi, Warji, Ganjuwa, Kirfi, Alkaleri, Darazo, Misau, Giade, Shira, Jamaare, Katagum, Itas/Gadau, Zaki, Gamawa and Damban.

History
The emirate was founded (1800–10) by Yakubu, one of Sheikh Usman dan Fodio's commanders. Yakubu conquered a sparsely wooded savanna region (the Bauchi High Plains) mainly inhabited by non-Muslim peoples. After successful campaigns,he founded (1809) the town of Bauchi. Yakubu built the town’s walls, the circumference of which measures 6.5 miles (10.5 km). 
The only non-Fulani flag-bearer of the Sokoto Empire.  The name was derived from a hunter called Baushe, who advised Yaqub to build his city west of the Warinje mountain.  In return Yaqub promised to name his city after the hunter.

Several of the subject peoples successfully revolted under the rule of his son and successor, Emir Ibrahim ibn Yakubu. Emir Usman moved the capital to Rauta (35 miles northwest) in 1877, but Bauchi once again became the emirate headquarters when, in 1902, the British occupied the town and deposed Emir Umaru. The town served as the provincial capital from 1904 until 1911 and again from 1917 to 1924. In 1926 it became the headquarters of Bauchi province and in 1976 capital of the newly created Bauchi state.
Abubakar Tafawa Balewa is buried in the city, while the Yankari National Park is 110 km from the state capital.
The city lies on the Port Harcourt – Maiduguri railway line. The Bauchi State Library Board was established in 1976.
With the coming of the railway in 1961, Bauchi grew as a collecting point for peanuts (groundnuts) and cotton and a trade centre in sorghum, millet, cowpeas, corn (maize), cassava, and vegetables and in cattle, goats, and sheep. Cotton weaving and dyeing, tanning, and blacksmithing are traditional activities. The town’s industry includes an asbestos factory and a meat-products processing plant. Abubakar Tafawa Balewa University (1980; originally called Federal University of Technology) and a federal polytechnic college are in the town. Pop. (2006) local government area, 493,810; (2016 est.) 415,000.

Transport 

Up until August, 2014, Bauchi was served by Bauchi Airport, located in-town.

Climate
According to the Köppen Climate Classification system, Bauchi has a tropical savanna climate, abbreviated "Aw" on climate maps.

Education 
Bauchi state is among the advanced centers of learning in Nigeria. It has many public and private institutions, These include universities own by the state and others own by federal government of Nigeria, other institutions present in the state are polytechnics, monothecnic, colleges of education, health technology institutions, secondary schools and primary schools.

Universities and institutions

 Abubakar Tafawa Balewa University 
 Bauchi State University
 Federal University of Health Science and Technology

colleges, polytechnics and secondary schools 

 Federal polytechnic Bauchi
 Bauchi state College of Agriculture
 School for Higher Islamic Studies
 Bogoro College of Education
 Sunnah College of Edication
 Mohammed Goni college of Legal and Islamic Studies

Languages 

 

 Fulani
  Gera 
 Jarawa
 Gere
 Sayawa (Zaar)
 Kir-Balar language, Kir Bengbet and Kir Bajang’le villages
 Zumbun language, Darazo LGA, Jimbim settlement
 Karai-Karai
 Boyawa (Ayah) Bogoro LGA.

Notable people

John Egbunu (born 1994), Nigerian-born American basketball player for Hapoel Jerusalem of the Israeli Basketball Premier League
Bala Mohammed Politician
Tekno professional musician known as Tekno, Augustine Miles Kelechi Okechukwu.
Dahiru Usman Preacher

Natural resources in Bauchi 
Bauchi has many occurring natural recources that are used by insdustries and also for commercial consumption. These include :

 Crude oil
 Limestone
 Iron ore
 Linite
 Gypsum

Tourism in Bauchi 
The state has many tourist attractions and landmarks; they include:
 Yankari National Park and Game Reserve
 Bauchi Emir's Palace
 Shehu Azare  Park
 Tafawa Balewa Tomb Monument
 Unity Park
 Abubakar Tafawa Balewa Stadium 
 Tunga Dutse
 Kalban Hills
 Panshanu Stone Heaps
 Tungan Maliki

See also 
 Bauchi Light Railway
 Railway stations in Nigeria
Abubakar Tafawa Balewa University Teaching Hospital
Bauchi State University

References 

State capitals in Nigeria
Local Government Areas in Bauchi State